André Jacques Kotzé (born ) is a South African professional rugby union player who most recently played for the . His regular position is prop.

Rugby career

2008–2009: Schoolboy rugby

Kotzé was born in Vredendal in the Western Cape, but grew up in Mpumalanga province, where he attended Hoërskool Nelspruit. He started all three of their matches at the tournament held in East London, scoring one try in their 14–41 defeat to the hosts Border.

At the conclusion of the Craven Week, he was included in a South Africa Under-18 High Performance squad that played three international matches against their counterparts from France and Namibia during August 2009. He was named on the bench for all three matches; he failed to make an appearance in their 39–3 victory over France in the first match, but played off the bench in their 93–10 victory over Namibia and their 39–6 victory over France in their second encounter.

2010–2012: Western Province and Sharks

After school, Kotzé moved to Cape Town to join the  youth structures. He was a key member of the  squad that participated in the 2010 Under-19 Provincial Championship, appearing in nine of their twelve matches during the regular season, scoring tries in matches against  and  en route to securing top spot in the log to qualify for the title play-offs. Kotzé came on as a replacement in their semi-final match against , a game that finished 36–36 after normal time and 49–49 after extra time, but saw Western Province progress to the final by virtue of scoring more tries in the match.

He was not used by Western Province in 2011, instead making a single appearance for the Durban-based  team in the 2011 Under-21 Provincial Championship.

He was included in the  squad for the 2012 Under-21 Provincial Championship, but after making three appearances, he made a mid-season move to the Johannesburg-based  outfit.

2012–2013: Golden Lions

2013–2014: Boland Cavaliers

He remained in the starting line-up for the majority of the season, making a total of thirteen appearances in their fourteen matches. Boland finished the season in fifth place, failing to qualify for the semi-finals.

He was named in their squad for the 2014 Vodacom Cup, but failed to make any further appearances for the team.

2014–present: White River / Pumas

He returned to Mpumalanga, where he played amateur club rugby for White River. At the end of 2015, the  invited nine amateur and youth players to train with them and Kotzé was one of three players that were awarded a contract to play for the team during the 2016 Currie Cup qualification series. He did not feature in any of their first five games, but appeared in all of their remaining nine matches in the competition. In the final one of those – a 35–13 victory over the  – Kotzé scored his first senior try two minutes from the end of the match. The Pumas finished fourth on the log, which was enough to ensure they would progress to the Premier Division of the Currie Cup.

References

South African rugby union players
Living people
1991 births
People from Matzikama Local Municipality
Boland Cavaliers players
Golden Lions players
Pumas (Currie Cup) players
Rugby union props
Rugby union players from the Western Cape